Landscape with the Temptation of Christ (Czech: Hornatá krajina s pokušením Krista) is an oil on oak panel painting by Flemish painter Joos de Momper. The painting is currently housed at the National Gallery in Prague.

Painting
Momper's style closely relates to the type of landscape painting popular in Flanders since the middle of the 16th century. Further, de Momper came to represent a group of painters who tended towards a more imaginary representation of landscape. This group of painters favored foreign views and alpine topography.

In this painting, the image is seen from a slant view, and framed by high mountain massifs. The latter descend on both sides to the valley wherein a river is flowing. The scenery, as well, is reminiscent of the works of Momper's predecessors. In the background, barely seen, there is the New Testament scene of the Temptation of Christ. A donkey tilts its head towards it, while a dog is firmly pointing to the two figures. The travelling people keep on marching untroubled down the mountain path.

References

Further reading

External links
Description of the painting and high quality picture thereof at the National Gallery of Prague
Painting at the Web Gallery of Art

16th-century paintings
17th-century paintings
Landscape paintings
Paintings by Joos de Momper
Paintings in the collection of the National Gallery Prague